Microsoft Publisher document file format used to create several different types of publications; some examples include newsletters, flyers, brochures, and postcards, as well as Web site and e-mail formats contain text and both raster and vector graphics.

Other uses
 Ventura Publisher publication file.
 The .pub extension is also used by SSH on public keys.

External links
Microsoft Office Suite

Computer file formats